Palikirus cosmetus is a species of air-breathing land snail, a terrestrial pulmonate gastropod mollusk in the family Charopidae. This species is endemic to Micronesia.

References

Fauna of Micronesia
Palikirus
Taxonomy articles created by Polbot